My Brother's Keeper Challenge is a public–private partnership of the United States federal government which promotes intervention by civic leaders in the lives of young men of color. The program was initiated in 2014 with sponsorship of the White House, the United States Department of Education, and the National Convening Council. The initiative obtained pledges by non-profit organizations of $200 million over five years. The initiative was intended to be a call to action for mayors, Native American tribal leaders, county executives, and other municipal leaders to address persistent opportunity gaps for young men of color and help them reach their potential.

The partnership was expanded one year after program launch with $100 million in additional funding from private entities. Private partners have included the College Board, Citi Foundation, AT&T, Discovery Communications, and the Emerson Collective. Youth Guidance's Becoming a Man program is an example of a recipient of funding from the My Brother's Keeper Challenge. The Boys of Color Collaboration is another example, pooling scholars from several universities with backing of the My Brother's Keeper Challenge.

The White House issued a one-year progress report on the My Brother's Keeper Challenge.

References

Race in the United States
Government programs
Private aid programs
2014 establishments in the United States